Hossein Kaebi (born September 23, 1985) is a retired Iranian footballer who last played for Sepidrood and Perspolis among other clubs in Persian Gulf Pro League.

Club career
Kaebi started his football in Esteghlal Ahvaz F.C. youth academy, before moving to Foolad. It was in this club that Croatian coach Vinko Begović quickly discovered him and soon he was in the first team line-up despite his tender young age. He was selected for the U17 team that played in the AFC U-17 Championship 2000. He was also selected for the national team soon after the Asian Championship. Kaebi started getting attention from European clubs at an early age and went on a 3-week trial at Wolverhampton Wanderers in 2003.
He was part of the Team that won the Iran's Premier Football League on 2004 with Foolad for first time.
Kaebi disappointed many when he signed for UAE club Emirates. Kaebi signed a contract with Persepolis F.C. on 25 February 2007 on a 6-month deal.

On 5 July 2007, he signed a two-year deal with Leicester City for an undisclosed fee, making his debut as a substitute in a 4–1 win over Watford on 25 August. Kaebi used a translator to speak for him during his time at Leicester City as he could not speak English. He was relegated to the reserve squad following the sacking of Martin Allen on 29 August.

Kaebi revealed on 19 September that he was settling in well with the club and was eager to show his talent to the fans. But on 15 October, he told the Leicester Mercury that he was frustrated at being left in the reserve squad. This left many Iranian fans to question the club's decision to leave an international footballer out of the first team setup. Kaebi later declared to Sky Sports that if his "time on the bench continues then" he would consider leaving Leicester.

He finally made his long-awaited start on 11 December in a 3–1 defeat to Ipswich Town on 11 December 2007. He was however transfer listed by then-manager Ian Holloway on 23 December, eight days after featuring in a 2–0 defeat to Hull City, his last ever appearance for the club. He was released by mutual consent on 4 February 2008, after he failed to secure a move from Leicester when the January transfer window closed.

Return to Iran

He was returned to Persepolis after he failed to make an impact at Leicester City. He won the Iran's Premier Football League for the second time under Afshin Ghotbi. Despite the offer from Persepolis F.C. he decided to move to Saipa F.C. He said he wanted to experience new team and he could not continue playing for Persepolis F.C. but he never said why. Many others believed that he moved to Saipa F.C. for a better offer. After 2 seasons he settled in one club and played in Asian Champions League also played 26 games in 2008–9 season for Saipa.Then he joined Steel Azin and spent two seasons before joining Rah Ahan in 2011 where he joined his beloved coach Ali Daei where they fall apart after Kaebi failed to attend few training sessions on time and he decided to leave and move to Sanat Naft in January 2013 where he stayed for half a season and 6 months before joining Esteghlal Khuzestan for 2013–14 season. After a short stint at Sepidrood, he announced his retirement from football in December 2018.

Club career statistics

 Assist Goals

International career 
Kaebi won his first cap having just turned 17, scoring his first international goal against Cameroon League XI on 15 August 2003, although the match was not considered an official international. He scored his first official goal for Iran against New Zealand in the 2003 AFC/OFC Cup Challenge . In 2004, he was named amongst World Soccer Magazine's Top 10 most promising players.
He was in Iran squad for 2004 Asian Cup which finished third and he also won the 2004 West Asian Football Federation Championship in Tehran.
Kaebi was in the Iran squad for the 2006 FIFA World Cup, appearing in all three matches of the group stage. His most memorable performance came against Portugal, where he was able to clamp down both Cristiano Ronaldo and Luís Figo. He was also included in the squad for the 2007 Asian Cup, making just one appearance against China, which ended in a 2–2 draw.
He was called to Team Melli for 2010 FIFA World Cup qualifying matches. He also performed in the 2011 AFC Asian Cup qualification for Team Melli.
In 2009, he made a mistake against Qatar in a friendly, which Iran lost in the last minute and Kaebi was dropped for the rest of the games and was used as a substitute for a while.

International caps

International goals 
Scores and results list Iran's goal tally first.

Honours

Club 
Iran Pro League Winner: 2
2004/05 with Foolad
2007/08 with Persepolis F.C.

International 
Iran
AFC/OFC Cup Challenge winner:
 2003
WAFF Championship winner: 
2004
Asian Cup
Third Place: 
2004
AFC U-16 Championship
Runner-up:
AFC U-17 Championship 2000

Iran U23
 Asian Games Gold Medal: 2002

References

Footnotes

General references
 حسین کعبی، مربی فولاد شد Retrieved in Persian www.farsnews.ir 
حسین کعبی تنها مشترک فولاد - السد(عکس) Retrieved in Persian www.varzesh3.com  
Portugal vs. Iran Retrieved in Soccerway 17 June 2006  
کعبی: چرا موقع گزارش بازی لستر از من اسم نمی‌برند؟ Retrieved in Persian www.varzesh3.com   
حسین کعبی، از تیم ملی نوجوانان تا لسترسیتی انگلیس Retrieved in Persian www.iribnews.ir   
بازی با پرتقال باید 50بار اخراج میشدم؛ رونالدو رو بدتر از فیگو زدم Retrieved in Persian www.irna.ir   
پاسخ صادقانه حسین کعبی به سوالات جنجالی علی ضیا ویدئو Retrieved in Persian www.ilna.news    
حسین کعبی: برای خداحافظی با علی کریمی مشورت کردم/ فوتبالم را با عزت شروع کردم و با عزت هم به پایان رساندم Retrieved in Persian www.tasnimnews.com     
Hossein Kaebi retires from football Retrieved in Persian www.tehrantimes.com      
What happened next: Hossein Kaebi – YouTube star, Leicester City nightmare and a political protest Retrieved www.Leicestermercury.com      
Fifa world cup 2006 Portugal vs. Iran Hossein Kaabi played in the main squad of the Iranian national team and received a yellow card in the form of Figo

External links 

 
 Hossein Kaebi at PersianLeague.com
 

 
Hossein Kaebi at metafootball 
 Hossein Kaebi at Instagram

1985 births
Living people
People from Ahvaz
Iranian footballers
Association football midfielders
Association football fullbacks
Foolad FC players
2004 AFC Asian Cup players
2006 FIFA World Cup players
2007 AFC Asian Cup players
Persepolis F.C. players
Leicester City F.C. players
Emirates Club players
Expatriate footballers in Qatar
Steel Azin F.C. players
Rah Ahan players
Saipa F.C. players
Al Sadd SC players
Esteghlal Khuzestan players
Sepidrood Rasht players
English Football League players
Iranian expatriate footballers
Iran international footballers
Iranian Arab sportspeople
Asian Games gold medalists for Iran
Asian Games medalists in football
Footballers at the 2002 Asian Games
Medalists at the 2002 Asian Games
Persian Gulf Pro League players
Azadegan League players
Qatar Stars League players
UAE Pro League players
Sportspeople from Khuzestan province
21st-century Iranian people